Gerardo Iasilli (November 10, 1880 – May 10, 1969) was an American composer. His work was part of the music event in the art competition at the 1932 Summer Olympics.

References

1880 births
1969 deaths
American male composers
Olympic competitors in art competitions
People from Muro Lucano
20th-century American male musicians